Moses ben Mordecai Bassola or simply Moses Bassola, alternative spelling: Moshe Basola, Basilea, Basila (Hebrew באסולה or simply: משה באסולה; alternative Hebrew spelling: באזלה ,איש באזולה ,ב(א)סולה ,באסל ,באזילא); born 1480 (year ה'ר"מ, Hebrew calendar), in Pesaro, Italy - died in 1560 (year ה'ש"כ, Hebrew calendar)) was a rabbi and a cabalist. His travel book has been published in English and modern Hebrew by Abraham David under the titles In Zion and Jerusalem: The Itinerary of Rabbi Moses Basola (1521–1523) (Jerusalem: C. G. Foundation Jerusalem Project Publications, 1999. 148 pp. [English], 48 pp. [Hebrew].)

Biography
Since he called himself Ẓarfati (the Frenchman), his family may have originated from France. R. Moses was the son of a famous rabbinical family in the Land of Israel and in Italy, living between the 15th century - 18th century. His last name - Bassola - shows that the family probably originated from Basel (the Latin form of the name is Basil) in Switzerland. He served in his youth in his hometown of Pesaro as a rabbi.

Land of Israel tour (1521–1523)
In 1521, he sailed to the Land of Israel via Cyprus and Crete and toured it for a year and a half. His impressions from this visit are documented in his book Sefer , in which he describes various sites in Ottoman Palestine (partial list), such as Bar'am, Ein Zeitim, Safed, Meron, Kefar Hananiah, Akbara, Peki'in, Amuka, Gush Halav, Dalton, Huqoq, Jethro's Tomb near the Horns of Hittin, Nablus, Jerusalem, Hebron, among other places.

In every place he visited, Rabbi Moses described the inhabitants of the country, the number of Jews living in each locality and their important occupations, including the burial sites of the righteous, synagogues, etc. During this period, Rabbi Moses resided in the settlement of Ein Zeitim, which had then a Jewish community of some forty families. The book became a primary source of information for Jewish life in the land of Israel and the country's attractions during those years.

Later life
After returning to Italy, R. Moses lived in Ancona and headed the Yeshiva there. In his later years, R. Moses made Aliyah to the Land of Israel and settled in Safed, where he was in a friendly relationship with the rabbis of the city, especially with R. Moses ben Jacob Cordovero. R. Moses' son, R. Azriel ben Moses Bassola, was a known scholar, whom among his students was R. Leon of Modena.

References

1480 births
1560 deaths
Kabbalists
Rabbis from Ancona
Rabbis in Safed
16th-century travelers
Rabbis of the Land of Israel
Holy Land travellers
16th-century Italian rabbis
Explorers of Asia
Jewish explorers
Medieval Jewish travel writers
Italian explorers
16th-century writers
Pilgrimage accounts
People from Pesaro